Cottle is an unincorporated community in Morgan County, Kentucky, United States.  It lies along U.S. Route 460 southeast of the city of West Liberty, the county seat of Morgan County.  Its elevation is 801 feet (244 m).

A post office was established in the community in 1931, which was named for Joseph Cottle, an early settler.

References

Unincorporated communities in Morgan County, Kentucky
Unincorporated communities in Kentucky